"Today My World Slipped Away" is a song co-written and first recorded by American country music artist Vern Gosdin. Gosdin's version was released in October 1982 as the fifth single and title track from his album Today My World Slipped Away.  Gosdin's version reached number 10 on the Billboard Hot Country Singles chart.  George Strait released a cover of the song in September 1997 as the third single from his album Carrying Your Love with Me.  Strait's version reached number 3 on the Billboard Hot Country Singles & Tracks chart in November 1997.  Gosdin wrote the song with Mark Wright.

Critical reception

Vern Gosdin version
Kip Kirby, of Billboard magazine reviewed the song favorably, saying that Gosdin's "great, resonant voice squeezes every nuance of pain out of this story of separation and loss." He goes on to say that the female harmony is "reminiscent of Gosdin's early vocal pairing with Emmylou Harris."

George Strait version
Wade Jessen, of Billboard magazine, called the Strait version a "tear-stained reprise."

Chart performance

Vern Gosdin version

George Strait version
"Today My World Slipped Away" debuted at number 65 on the U.S. Billboard Hot Country Singles & Tracks for the week of September 6, 1997.

References

1982 singles
1997 singles
Vern Gosdin songs
George Strait songs
Songs written by Mark Wright (record producer)
Songs written by Vern Gosdin
Song recordings produced by Tony Brown (record producer)
MCA Nashville Records singles
1982 songs